Silvio Rafael Gámez (born August 8, 1963), better known as Leo Gámez, is a Venezuelan former professional boxer who competed from 1985 to 2005. He is the first boxer in history to win world titles in the four lightest weight divisions, having held the WBA minimumweight title from 1989 to 1990, the WBA light flyweight title from 1993 to 1995, the WBA flyweight title in 1999, and the WBA super flyweight title from 2000 to 2001.

Gámez is considered by some boxing critics to be among Venezuela's best fighters since the Betulio González era.

Debut/The 1980s
He made his professional boxing debut on February 14, 1985, in Maracay, when he decisioned Francisco García over four rounds. On April 17 of that same year, he got his second victory, another four round points win, this time over Alcides Hernandez, also in Maracay. After those two wins, Gámez had six consecutive knockout wins, including two over Rafael Lara, and one in his first fight outside Maracay, held on August 14 at El Guayabo, where he beat Jose Escorcia in the fourth round. On November 28 of 1986, he would beat Escorcia's brother, Alberto, also by knockout in four rounds, at Maracaibo.

On February 2, 1987, he suffered his first "blemish", when he was held to a two-round technical draw by Rafael Bolivar, at Maracay. By then, Gámez was becoming a well known boxer among Hispanic boxing fans, Guantes magazine mentioning him sporadically on their articles.

On April 30, Gámez received his first shot at a title, when he was faced with Pedro Nieves in the Venezuelan town of Turnero, for the national Jr. Flyweight title. Gámez won the championship with a second-round knockout.

He defended the title one time and won a handful of non-title bouts before reducing weight in order to get his first world championship opportunity.

On January 10, 1988, Gámez fought for the WBA's vacant world Minimumweight championship against Bong-Jun Kim. In what also was his first fight abroad, Gámez became world champion for the first time when he outpointed Kim over 12 rounds in South Korea. After that victory, he became a celebrity both in Venezuela and internationally, as he went from being mentioned in articles, as aforementioned, to having articles written about him on magazines that specialized in boxing.

He had several managerial problems after winning his first world championship, however, and he was able to defend that title only one time, knocking out Kenji Yokozawa in three rounds at Japan. When he suffered a broken arm not too long after, he decided to vacate the title, and took an extended lay-off from boxing.

On October 29, 1989, Gámez was finally able to make a comeback, and he knocked out Victoriano Hernandez in five rounds that night. After one more win, he attempted, for the first time, to win the WBA's world Jr. Flyweight championship. On April 29, 1990, he was faced with long reigning world champion Myung-Woo Yuh, once again, in South Korea. Gámez lost a controversial twelve-round decision; many fans and observers thought he deserved the win, and the WBA ordered an immediate rematch. On November 10 of that year, he would again fight Woo Yuh in South Korea, and, once again, Woo Yuh won by a twelve-round decision to retain the world title.

The 1990s
Disillusioned, Gámez took off almost one more year off boxing. But he returned, inspired with the idea of winning the WBA's world Flyweight championship. Having been promised a title try by the WBA, he began training and, after his training was complete, he returned to South Korea, where he challenged WBA world Flyweight champion Yong-Kang Kim on November 5, 1991. Gámez once again lost by a twelve-round decision, but he decided to stay active in boxing after that loss.

Gámez won four fights in a row before once again dropping weight in order to challenge for a world title. His third try at the WBA's world Jr. Flyweight title, which was vacant after Woo Yuh's retirement, came on November 21, 1993, against Shiro Yashiro, in Tokyo. Gámez finally won the world Jr. Flyweight title, his second world championship, by knocking Yashiro out in nine rounds. He defended the title successfully three times, with fights in Panama and Thailand (twice), before losing it to Hi-Yong Choi on February 4 of 1995, once again in Korea. On May 20 of that year, he won the regional WBA Fedelatin Flyweight title by defeating Aquiles Guzmán by a twelve-round decision in Paraguay.

Gámez's first opportunity at joining the elite group of fighters who have won world championships in three different divisions, and his second attempt at becoming world Flyweight champion, came on March 24, 1996, against world champion Saen Sor Ploenchit in Thailand. Gámez failed that time, however, dropping a twelve-round split decision to the champion. Then, he lost the Fedelatin title in a rematch with Guzmán, held on October 7 at Maracay. Guzmán outpointed him over twelve rounds as well.

Gámez became, once again, disillusioned with boxing. In 1998, however, he returned to the sport, knocking out Gilberto González on November 3 in eight rounds in Venezuela, to regain the Fedelatin title.

Gámez joined the exclusive group of champions to win titles in three or more divisions, at the same time becoming the first one among those to be world Flyweight champion, when he knocked out defending WBA world Flyweight champion Hugo Rafael Soto in the third round on March 13, 1999. The fight, held at New York's Madison Square Garden, also marked Gámez's debut as a professional fighter in the United States. After this win, Gámez received a hero's welcome at Caracas' Simón Bolívar International Airport.

The 2000s
On May 29, he won the WBA's "interim" world Super Flyweight championship by knocking out former WBO world Jr. Flyweight champion Josué Camacho in the fifth round at the Roberto Clemente Coliseum in San Juan, Puerto Rico. He was not generally considered to be a four division world champion, however, because the WBA had conditioned their recognition of him as world Super Flyweight champion on either one of two things happening: the real champion, Hideki Todaka, would have to decide to leave his place as champion or Gámez would have to beat him in a fight in order for Gámez to be recognized as champion. After losing the Flyweight crown on September 3 to Sornpichai Kratingdaengym by knockout in eight rounds at a Thai hotel, Gámez received an opportunity to solidify his status as WBA world Super Flyweight champion, when the official champion, Todaka, gave him a shot on October 9, 2000.

Gámez made history once again, joining the small group of boxers who have won world titles in four different divisions, first quadruple same organization world champions (all WBA four champions) and becoming both the first one among those to have held the world Flyweight title and the first Venezuelan in that group, when he knocked Todaka out in seven rounds at Nagoya. On his first defense, held on March 11, 2001, in Yokohama, Japan, he lost the crown by a ten-round Technical knockout to Celes Kobayashi.

After one more win, Gámez attempted to join the very exclusive group of fighters to win world titles in five different divisions, when he lost to WBA world Bantamweight champion Johnny Bredahl by a twelve-round decision, on November 8, 2002, in Copenhagen, Denmark.

Gámez, as of 2014, is currently training young boxers in San Juan de los Morros in the Guarico state, and many other cities in Venezuela.

Retirement
After losing to Prakorb Udomna of Thailand, Gámez decided to retire for good from boxing, leaving with a record of 35 wins, 12 losses and 1 draw, 26 of his wins coming by knockout. His last fight was held in Thailand.

Professional boxing record

See also 
List of boxing quadruple champions
List of minimumweight boxing champions
List of light-flyweight boxing champions
List of flyweight boxing champions
List of super-flyweight boxing champions

External links
 

1963 births
Living people
Mini-flyweight boxers
World mini-flyweight boxing champions
Light-flyweight boxers
World light-flyweight boxing champions
Flyweight boxers
World flyweight boxing champions
Super-flyweight boxers
World super-flyweight boxing champions
World Boxing Association champions
Venezuelan male boxers
People from Guárico